The 1965–66 Yugoslav Second League season was the 20th season of the Second Federal League, the second level association football competition of SFR Yugoslavia, since its establishment in 1946. The league was contested in two regional groups (West Division and East Division), with 18 clubs each, two more than in the previous season.

West Division

Teams
A total of eighteen teams contested the league, including thirteen sides from the 1964–65 season and five sides promoted from the third tier leagues played in the 1964–65 season. The league was contested in a double round robin format, with each club playing every other club twice, for a total of 34 rounds. Two points were awarded for wins and one point for draws.

There were no teams relegated from the 1964–65 Yugoslav First League. The five clubs promoted to the second level were Bosna, Leotar, Segesta, Slovan and Zadar. At the winter break, Slovan abandoned competition due to lack of funding.

League table

East Division

Teams
A total of eighteen teams contested the league, including thirteen sides from the 1964–65 season, one club relegated from the 1964–65 Yugoslav First League and four sides promoted from the third tier leagues played in the 1964–65 season. The league was contested in a double round robin format, with each club playing every other club twice, for a total of 34 rounds. Two points were awarded for wins and one point for draws.

Sutjeska were relegated from the 1964–65 Yugoslav First League after finishing in the 15th place of the league table. The four clubs promoted to the second level were Lovćen, Radnički Sombor, Sloboda Titovo Užice and Sloga Kraljevo.

League table

See also
1965–66 Yugoslav First League
1965–66 Yugoslav Cup

Yugoslav Second League seasons
Yugo
2